Pulimeru is a south Indian village in Peddapuram Mandal in East Godavari District of Andhra Pradesh.

The village is actually called as "Polimera" which means the border. The village is border of peddapuram maharaja's kingdom and has a lot of historical importance 
In the 2011 census, it had a population of 3881, made up 1966 males and 1915 combining to make 1075 families.

References

Villages in East Godavari district